4760 Jia-xiang, provisional designation , is a background asteroid from the inner regions of the asteroid belt, approximately  in diameter. It was discovered on 1 April 1981, by astronomers at Harvard University's Oak Ridge Observatory in Massachusetts, United States. The presumed stony S-type asteroid was named after Chinese astronomer Zhang Jiaxiang. It has a rotation period of 14.96 hours.

Orbit and classification 

Jia-xiang is a non-family asteroid from the main belt's background population. It orbits the Sun in the inner main-belt at a distance of 2.0–2.6 AU once every 3 years and 7 months (1,296 days; semi-major axis of 2.33 AU). Its orbit has an eccentricity of 0.13 and an inclination of 10° with respect to the ecliptic. The body's observation arc begins with a precovery taken at Palomar Observatory in January 1955, or 26 years prior to its official discovery observation at Oak Ridge.

Physical characteristics

Rotation period 

In 2017, two rotational lightcurves of Jia-xiang were obtained from photometric observations by Czech astronomer Petr Pravec at Ondřejov Observatory. Lightcurve analysis gave a rotation period of 14.96 and 14.9601 hours with a brightness amplitude of 0.55 and 0.63 magnitude, respectively.

Diameter and albedo 

According to the survey carried out by the NEOWISE mission of NASA's Wide-field Infrared Survey Explorer, Jia-xiang measures between 4.79 and 5.16 kilometers in diameter and its surface has an albedo between 0.13 and 0.2275.

The Collaborative Asteroid Lightcurve Link assumes an albedo of 0.20 and calculates a diameter of 4.71 kilometers based on an absolute magnitude of 14.0.

Naming 

This minor planet was named after Chinese astronomer Zhang Jiaxiang (born 1932). The official naming citation was published by the Minor Planet Center on 21 November 1991.

Notes

References

External links 
 Asteroid Lightcurve Database (LCDB), query form (info )
 Dictionary of Minor Planet Names, Google books
 Asteroids and comets rotation curves, CdR – Observatoire de Genève, Raoul Behrend
 Discovery Circumstances: Numbered Minor Planets (1)-(5000) – Minor Planet Center
 
 

004760
004760
Named minor planets
19810401